Cleavage and polyadenylation specificity factor subunit 7 is a protein that in humans is encoded by the CPSF7 gene.

Function 

CPSF7, also known as CFIm59, is the cleavage factor of two closely associated protein complexes in the 3' untranslated region of a newly synthesized pre-messenger RNA (mRNA) molecule used in gene transcription.  CPSF7 is one of three Cleavage and polyadenylation specificity factors (CPSF), the other two being CFIm25 (or CPSF5/NUDT21) and CFIm68 (or CPSF6).

References

Further reading